Heidi Bucher (1926–1993) was a Swiss artist interested in exploring architectural space and the body through sculpture. She was born in Winterthur, Switzerland and attended the School for the Applied Arts in Zurich. Her work dealt primarily with private spaces, the body, domestication, and individual and collective experiences.

Early work 
Bucher's early work was mainly focused on the body. In the early 1970s, she moved to Los Angeles. While there, she collaborated with her then-husband Carl Bucher on Landings to Wear and Bodyshells. The large-scale, wearable works blurred the boundary between sculpture and apparel, and they were featured on the cover of Harper's Bazaar.  An 8mm film shows the oversized foam "Bodyshells" in action on Venice Beach.  They were showcased in an exhibition at the Museum of Contemporary Crafts (now the Museum of Art and Design) in New York City and exhibited at LACMA in April 1972.

Later work

Bucher became more interested in the body's relationship to space in her later work. In the mid-1970s she began experimenting with a new technique, in which she soaked gauze sheets in latex rubber, and used them to cast the interior surfaces of the rooms of her grandparents' house in Winterthur, Switzerland. These were then pulled off in sheets to create thin, skin-like casts of the space; she referred to these casts as "Skinnings." In 2017, she was selected to be part of the main exhibition at the 57th Venice Biennale, VIVA ARTE VIVA.

Solo exhibitions 

 2018: Heidi Bucher, Parasol Unit, London, UK
 2016: Hommage à Heidi Bucher und Carl Bucher, Kulturort Galerie Weiertal, Winterthur, CH
 2014: Swiss Institute Contemporary Art, New York, USA
 2014: Alexander Gray Associates, New York, USA
 2013: Freymond-Guth Fine Arts, Zurich, CH
 2013: Centre Culturel Suisse, Paris, France
 2013: The Approach, London, UK
 2004: Heidi Bucher – Mother of Pearl, Migros Museum für Gegenwartskunst, Zurich, CH
 1995: Kunsthaus / Barlach Halle K, Hamburg, DE
 1993: Villa Bleuler, Galerie im Weissen Haus, Winterthur, CH
 1993: Und ziehen das Gestern ins Heute: Die Häute aus dem Bellevue Projekt, Kunstmuseum Thurgau, CH
 1983: Hauträume, Kunstmuseum Winterthur, CH
 1981: Räume sind Hüllen sind Häute, Galerie Maeght, Zurich, CH
 1979: Parketthaut / Herrenzimmer / Mobili, Galerie Maeght, Zurich, CH
 1979: L‘Objet préféré de l‘artiste, Galerie Numaga, Auvernier, CH
 1977: Einbalsamierungen, Borg, Galerie Maeght, Zurich, CH
 1973: Bodywrappings, Esther Bear Gallery, Santa Barbara, CA, USA
 1972: Bodyshells, Los Angeles County Museum of Art, CA, USA
 1971:  Soft Sculptures to wear, Museum of Contemporary Crafts (Happenings in conjunction with solo shows by Carl Bucher), New York, NY, USA
 1971: Musée d’Art Contemporain, Montréal (Happenings in conjunction with solo shows by Carl Bucher), CDN
 1958: Silkcollage, World House Galleries, New York, NY, USA
 1956: Collagen, Galerie Suzanne Feigel, Basel, CH

References

External links

 Official Website

1926 births
1993 deaths
20th-century Swiss women artists
20th-century Swiss sculptors
Contemporary sculptors
Swiss contemporary artists
Swiss women sculptors